Salim Aliyow Ibrow  is a Somali politician. He briefly served as the Acting Prime Minister of Somalia in 2007. From January to October 2014, Ibrow was also the Minister of Environment and Livestock. He is the Minister of Justice and Constitutional Affairs of Somalia.

Career

Early career
Ibrow served as the interim Prime Minister of the Transitional Federal Government from October 29, 2007 to November 24, 2007, following the resignation of Premier Ali Mohammed Ghedi. Prior to his interim promotion, Ibrow served as Ghedi's deputy premier. His portfolio changed several times over numerous cabinet reshufflings over the years, including the ministries of Finance, Livestock, Culture and Higher Education.

Ibrow was one of the MPs contending for the Parliamentary Speaker's position after the dismissal of ex-Speaker Sharif Hassan Sheikh Aden. He is also the National Commissioner for UNESCO in Somalia.

Ibrow was replaced as Prime Minister by Nur Hassan Hussein on November 22, 2007, and was appointed Minister of Justice and Religious Affairs.

Minister of Environment and Livestock
On 17 January 2014, Ibrow was appointed Minister of Environment and Livestock (Minister of Veterinary and Animal Husbandry) by Prime Minister Abdiweli Sheikh Ahmed.

Minister of Justice and Constitutional Affairs of Somalia
On 25 October 2014, Ibrow's term as Minister of Veterinary and Animal Husbandry ended following a Cabinet reshuffle. He was replaced at the position with former Minister of Justice and Constitutional Affairs of Somalia Farah Sh. Abdulkadir Mohamed. Ibrow was in turn assigned Mohamed's office.

Notes

Year of birth missing (living people)
Living people
21st-century prime ministers of Somalia
Members of the Transitional Federal Parliament
Government ministers of Somalia